Six Variations on "Hélas, j'ai perdu mon amant", K. 360/374b, is a composition in G minor for piano and solo violin by Wolfgang Amadeus Mozart, composed when he was 25 years old (June 1781).

However, it appears that Mozart misnamed the melody used, which was actually entitled "Au bord d'une fontaine" ("By the edge of a fountain"). The Neue Mozart-Ausgabe points out that no French tune bearing the title "Hélas, j'ai perdu mon amant" ever existed. The melody also existed far earlier in France than Albanèse's version, since at least the sixteenth century.

It is thought to have been written for Mozart's first piano student in Vienna, Marie Karoline, Countess Thiennes de Rumbeke (1755–1812), a cousin of Philipp von Cobenzl.

See also
 List of variations on a theme by another composer

References

External links
 
 
 , Henryk Szeryng (violin), Ingrid Haebler (piano)

Compositions by Wolfgang Amadeus Mozart
Ah vous dirais-je, Maman
1781 compositions
Compositions in G minor